The 41st Blue Dragon Film Awards ceremony was held on February 9, 2021 at Paradise City, Incheon. Organized by Sports Chosun (a sister brand of Chosun Ilbo). It was aired live on SBS.

COVID-19 pandemic 
Due to the ongoing COVID-19 pandemic, this year’s ceremony will have several safety measures in place. Set to take place in Paradise City in Incheon, the ceremony will be “ontact,” meaning that there will be no live audience in the arena. However, a multiscreen will be set up near the stage so that fans can cheer on their stars through a video screen.

There will be a limit on the number of people allowed in the building to comply with social distancing guidelines. There will also be temperature checks, installation of hand sanitizer dispensers, and sterilization of the event arena. For the actors attending the ceremony, the usual audience seats will be replaced with small tables, with a small number of people seated at each table. There will also be clear plastic guards to separate the celebrities.

The event organizer announced the postponement on December 8, saying that due to the rapid re-proliferation of COVID-19, the 41st Blue Dragon Film Awards, scheduled to be held on December 11, will be postponed till early 2021.

Nominees & winners 

 

The nominees for the 41st Blue Dragon Film Awards were announced on November 11, 2020.

Winners are listed first, highlighted in boldface, and indicated with a double dagger.

Films that received multiple awards and nominations 
The following films received multiple wins:

See also 

 56th Baeksang Arts Awards
 56th Grand Bell Awards
 29th Buil Film Awards

References 

Blue Dragon Film Awards
Blue Dragon Film Awards
Blue Dragon Film Awards
Blue Dragon Film Awards